Llanwddyn is a village and community in Montgomeryshire, Powys, Wales. The community is centred on the Lake Vyrnwy reservoir.

Geography
Llanwddyn borders the county of Gwynedd to the northeast, with the Powys communities of Llangynog and Pen-y-Bont-Fawr to the northwest, Llanfihangel-yng-Ngwynfa to the south east and Banwy to the southwest. The community is sparsely populated, but includes the village of Abertridwr as well as the new village of Llanwddyn.

According to the 2011 census the community had 99 occupied households and a population of 257, with only 84 of the residents born in Wales. This is a 17% decrease since the 310 people noted in 2001.
In 2011, only 38% of the population could speak Welsh, a decline from 60% in 2001.

Lake Vyrnwy

The main feature of the community is the  reservoir, which drowned the original village when it was created in the 1880s.

Climate

History

By the mid-19th century the village of Llanwddyn consisted of thirty seven houses, a church and two chapels, three pubs and several shops. The population of the parish had dropped from 668 in 1831 to 443 in 1871. In 1873 the local vicar, Reverend Thomas H. Evans, published a mass of information about Llanwddyn in Volume VI of the Montgomeryshire Collections. He described the abundance of water with, for example, one third of the valley being regularly under water during the winter.

In 1877 the expanding English city of Liverpool identified the Vyrnwy Valley as a suitable site for a reservoir to supply fresh water to its citizens. A parliamentary bill was drawn up to authorise the construction of a dam and reservoir. The population of Llanwddyn were not consulted, though they presented a signed petition against the proposals.

The Liverpool Corporation Waterworks Act was passed in 1880 and construction of a dam across the valley began in 1881. It took seven years to complete. The old village was demolished, the valley flooded, and the water reached the lip of the dam on 22 November 1889.

A new village was constructed below the dam to house the original residents. It included a church, dedicated to St Wddyn, which was consecrated on 27 November 1888, the day before the valve of the dam was finally closed. A hydroelectric power plant was built for the village in 1902. The reservoir brought jobs and relative prosperity to the community, with the population remaining relatively stable for the next 70 years.

In 1974, ownership of the estate passed from the Liverpool Corporation to the Severn Trent Water Authority .

Governance
Llanwddyn has a community council which has up to seven locally elected councillors.

Llanwddyn also gives its name to the Llanwddyn electoral ward which elects a councillor to Powys County Council. At the May 2017 council election Bryn Davies won Llanwddyn as Plaid Cymru's first seat on Powys Council.

References

External links
 Llanwddyn Community Council

 
Former villages in Wales
Forcibly depopulated communities in Wales